is a Japanese otokonoko romantic comedy manga series by Akane Terai, which has been serialized by Kodansha in their magazine Shonen Magazine Edge since June 17, 2017. Kodansha has also collected it in ten tankōbon volumes. The story follows Amachin, a feminine young man who is attracted to his friend Tatsumi, and tries to make him like him back by dressing and acting cutely. The series was well received by readers and critics for its title character, and was nominated for the 2018 Next Manga Award.

Premise
Amachin wa Jishou Osu is an otokonoko romantic comedy manga set in Ishikawa Prefecture in Japan. It follows Kokoro "Amachin" Amasawa, a feminine young man who often gets mistaken for a woman due to his looks, to the point where his male classmates fall in love with him, including his childhood friend and classmate Tatsumi Kamishimo. Amachin is attracted to Tatsumi and tries to win him over by presenting himself in a cute way.

Production and release
Amachin wa Jishou Osu is written and illustrated by Akane Terai and has been serialized by Kodansha in their manga magazine Shonen Magazine Edge since its July 2017 issue, released on June 17, 2017. The series went on hiatus in April 2022, but resumed the same year in the magazine's October issue.

Since November 16, 2017, Kodansha has also collected the series in tankōbon volumes under the imprint Magazine Edge Comics. The fourth volume was made available in both a standard edition and a digital special edition that includes a photo book-style set of color illustrations depicting a date with Amachin. The volumes are also released in Chinese by Tong Li Publishing since 2019.

On December 25, 2021, a promotional video was released to celebrate the 500,000 sales of the series, in which Amachin was voiced by Hiromi Igarashi.

Volumes

Reception
The series was well received and was nominated for the 2018 Next Manga Award. It is also popular with readers; in a 2020 survey about what manga series people would like to see adapted into an anime series, where 70% of respondents were women, Amachi wa Jishou Osu was the 15th most requested. The series has performed well commercially, with volume 1 maintaining the number one ranking on Pixiv for a month after its release. The print volumes sold enough to warrant a reprint of the first three volumes by May 2019.

Critics liked the title character for his cuteness; Music.jp appreciated the series for Amachin's cuteness, naivete, and slight eroticism, and called it a great and refreshing otokonoko series. Bukumaru called it a must-read otokonoko manga: they appreciated it for the contrast between Amachin's appearance and brazenness, calling him cuter than girls and bolder than guys. They also enjoyed the depiction of Amachin's and Tatsumi's relationship, finding it unique and interesting to follow. Honcierge also found the contrast interesting, exemplified by the volume 1 cover art, showing what appears to be a cute girl in the men's bathroom. They also enjoyed the rest of the cast, considering them to stand out, and liked their character designs, commending Terai for her ability to draw both cute and cool characters. Magmix recommended it to readers who like comedy manga.

Notes

References

External links
  

Cross-dressing in anime and manga
Ishikawa Prefecture in fiction
Kodansha manga
LGBT in anime and manga
Romantic comedy anime and manga
Shōnen manga